Fellows of the Royal Society elected in 2011.

Fellows (FRS)

Robin Allshire
Andrew Balmford
Jeremy Baumberg
Hagan Bayley
Béla Bollobás
Doreen Cantrell
Stan Cowley
Alan Cowman
Alun Millward Davies
Nicholas Peter Franks
Ian Hector Frazer
Steven J. Gamblin
John William Goodby
Alan Grafen
Clare P Grey
Janet Hemingway
Ian Horrocks
Sir Colin Humphreys
Alejandro Kacelnik
Robert Charles Kennicutt
Steffen Lilholt Lauritzen
Yuk Ming Dennis Lo
Ian Manners
David Eusthatios Manolopoulos
Gerhard Theodor Materlik
James McKernan
Tom McLeish
 Sir David Roberts McMurtry
Mervyn John Miles
Arthur David Milner
John Morton
Sean Munro
Werner Nahm
Kostya Novoselov
Mark Pagel
(Ronald) John Parkes
Fiona Powrie
Mark Felton Randolph
Leonard Robert Stephens
Patrick Ping Leung Tam
Simon Tavaré
Angela Carmen Vincent
Sir Mark Walport
Robert Watson

Foreign Members (ForMemRS)

David Chandler
Joanne Chory
Mikhail Gromov
Thomas J.R. Hughes
Phillip Allen Sharp
Carla J Shatz
Thomas Steitz
Edward Manin Stolper

References 

2011
2011 in science
2011 in the United Kingdom